Piebald frog may refer to:

 Piebald odorous frog (Odorrana schmackeri), a frog in the family Ranidae endemic to China
 Piebald spiny frog (Nanorana maculosa), a frog in the family Dicroglossidae endemic to Yunnan, China

Animal common name disambiguation pages